Lho Shin-yong (28 February 1930 – 21 October 2019) was a South Korean politician, diplomat and intelligence chief, who served as the 18th Prime Minister, the 18th Foreign Minister and the 12th Director of the Agency of National Security Planning (ANSP, now National Intelligence Service) of the fifth South Korean republic.

Beginning his career in the diplomatic service, Lho served as the Consul General to Los Angeles since 1968, Consul General to New Delhi since 1972, Ambassador to India since 1973, Vice Foreign Minister and Permanent Representative in Geneva since 1976. After that he was promoted to the position as Foreign Minister, from 2 September 1980 to 1 June 1982. From 2 June 1982 to 18 February 1985 he served as the ANSP Director. On 19 February 1985 he was appointed as the acting PM until 15 May, officially taking the post on the next day, and left office on 25 May 1987.

References

1930 births
2019 deaths
Prime Ministers of South Korea
Foreign ministers of South Korea
Directors of the Agency for National Security Planning
Ambassadors of South Korea to India
People from South Pyongan
Gwangsan No clan
Seoul National University alumni
Kentucky State University alumni